Făcăi may refer to several places in Romania:

 Făcăi, a village administered by Craiova municipality, Dolj County
 Făcăi, a village administered by Ocnele Mari town, Vâlcea County